Coccolithales is an order of Haptophyceae. The Coccolithales has long been considered one of only two orders in the Coccolithophyceae, the other order being the Isochrysidales.

References

Haptophyte orders
Bikont orders